Rambert (known as Rambert Dance Company before 2014) is a leading British dance company.  Formed at the start of the 20th century as a classical ballet company, it exerted a great deal of influence on the development of dance in the United Kingdom, and today, as a contemporary dance company, continues to be one of the world's most renowned dance companies.  It has previously been known as the Ballet Club, and the Ballet Rambert.

History
Dame Marie Rambert (1888–1982), founder of Rambert Dance Company, was born in Warsaw, Poland where she was inspired to become a dancer after seeing Isadora Duncan perform. She went to Paris and after an early career as a recital artist and teacher she was engaged by Serge Diaghilev's Ballets Russes as assistant to the choreographer Vaslav Nijinsky on The Rite of Spring. She also taught Dalcroze Eurythmics to the company. During her year with the Ballets Russes her appreciation of classical ballet developed thus combining a love for traditional and new dance forms. During the First World War she settled in England where she met and married the playwright Ashley Dukes. Her association with Diaghilev led her to study ballet with the renowned Italian ballet master Enrico Cecchetti, after which she joined the company as a dancer in the corps de ballet.  In 1919 Rambert established a dance school in Notting Hill Gate, London, teaching Checchetti's methods and in 1920, she transitioned into teaching ballet professionally. The school would become the foundation of today's Rambert Dance Company.

In 1926, Rambert formed a dance troupe using students from her school. Known as the Rambert Dancers, they performed in revues at various London venues. In 1930, the troupe was re-established as the Ballet Club at the Mercury Theatre in London, which was owned by Rambert's husband. The Ballet Club was formed using the finest dance talent that Rambert could find, and was to become the first classical ballet company established in the United Kingdom. The present day Rambert Dance Company is the UK's oldest established dance company. Despite being based at the Mercury Theatre, the company was best known as a touring company, travelling nationwide and soon became known as the Ballet Rambert, the title by which it was most commonly recognised until the current name was adopted in the 1980s.

As the Ballets Russes had disbanded following the death of Serge Diaghilev in 1929, a number of Rambert's former colleagues joined the Ballet Rambert in its formative years, including Alicia Markova and Anton Dolin, who would later become the first stars of Dame Ninette de Valois' Royal Ballet.

A number of internationally renowned dancers and choreographers made their early appearances with the Ballet Rambert, including Frederick Ashton, Antony Tudor, Agnes de Mille, Andrée Howard, Pearl Argyle, Walter Gore and Peggy van Praagh.

During the 1970s the Ballet Rambert also presented shows, first on stage and later via BBC television to engage the interest of a younger audience, using the anagrammatic name Bertram Batell's Side Show.

Whilst developing a strong ballet culture in Britain and insisting on solid classical training, Rambert always intended that her company would dictate new trends in dance. The Ballet Rambert was recognised as one of the most innovative ballet companies of the 20th century, producing some of the world's most renowned choreographers. By the middle of the century, the Royal Ballet had superseded the company as the UK's leading classical ballet company, so Rambert made the decision to diversify the work of the company, introducing modern and neoclassical work into the repertoire. In the 1960s, the Ballet Rambert moved completely from classical ballet, concentrating instead on the development of contemporary dance. The company has since developed a worldwide reputation in this field, becoming known as the Rambert Dance Company in 1987. In 2013, Dance Company was dropped from its title, to become simply Rambert.

Rambert tours Britain annually, accompanied by its own Rambert Orchestra (formerly the associate orchestra London Musici).  It is commonly associated with such theatres as Sadler's Wells the Theatre Royal, Brighton and The Lowry in Salford, Greater Manchester. In November 2013, Rambert moved from Chiswick, London, to new, purpose-built headquarters on London's South Bank. The company was given a plot of land by Coin Street Community Builders, in exchange for delivering an annual dance outreach programme. For the first time in its history, Rambert's new home will allow the public greater access to its extensive archive material in a purpose-built resource centre. Her Majesty The Queen, accompanied by His Royal Highness The Duke of Edinburgh, officially opened Rambert's new home on the South Bank on Friday 21 March 2014.

Members 
Notable members of the Company have included: Frederick Ashton, Antony Tudor, Diana Gould (who married Yehudi Menuhin), Audrey Hepburn, Maude Lloyd, Sally Gilmour, Beryl Goldwyn, Lucette Aldous, Christopher Bruce and Norman Morrice.

Artistic Director 
The artistic director until 2017 was Mark Baldwin (a former dancer with the company), and the executive director is Helen Shute. The search for a new artistic director was finished when as of October 2018 with the appointment of Benoit Swan Pouffer.

In 2005, the Institute of Physics commissioned the Rambert Dance Company to produce a dance commemorating the centenary of Albert Einstein's groundbreaking scientific ideas of 1905. The piece, choreographed by Mark Baldwin, was called Constant Speed.

In 2009, the company toured The Comedy of Change with music composed by Julian Anderson and production design by Kader Attia. Choreography was by Mark Baldwin, who said: "It started with something Stephen Keynes, my friend for about 30 years, came up with. His mother's father was Darwin's son – he's the great-grandson. He's also nephew of John Maynard Keynes, so the ballerina Lydia Lopokova of course was his auntie. He made the suggestion that we do a piece to commemorate the Darwin year, 2009"

The Rambert School
The Rambert Ballet School that Rambert founded in 1919, has reinvented itself on a number of occasions since, and due to the changes and innovations of the dance company, three separate schools have operated under the name. Two of these schools later merged and the third closed to leave the school which survives today.

The present day school is based in premises in Twickenham, London, and was formed in 2001 as part of the West London Institute of Higher Education. This was later subsumed into Brunel University and in 2003, the Rambert School became independent again and is now known as the Rambert School of Ballet and Contemporary Dance. It offers a two-year foundation degree, a three-year bachelor's degree, a three-year vocational course, and postgraduate courses to doctoral level. Students go on to achieve positions with dance companies including Dutch National Ballet, Northern Ballet Theatre, Scottish Ballet, Boston Ballet, Netherlands Dance Theatre, Merce Cunningham Dance Company, Richard Alston Dance Company, Rambert Dance Company, Bejart Ballet and Scottish Dance Theatre. The Rambert School is an affiliate of the Conservatoire for Dance and Drama. The current principal and artistic director is Amanda Britton.

References

Bibliography

Reviews
 Ballet Magazine by Lynette Halewood, October 1998

External links
Rambert Dance Company 
Archive footage of Ballet Rambert dancing Gala Performance in 1959 at Jacob's Pillow
Rambert School of Ballet and Contemporary Dance

Dance companies in the United Kingdom
Ballet companies in the United Kingdom
Contemporary dance in London
National Dance Award winners
1919 establishments in England
Performing groups established in 1919